Little Six Casino is owned and operated by the Shakopee Mdewakanton Sioux Community in Prior Lake, Minnesota, southwest of the Minneapolis-Saint Paul metropolitan area.  The casino features slots and live dealer blackjack tables.  With 4,100 employees, the SMSC, Mystic Lake Casino Hotel, and Little Six Casino combined are the largest employer in Scott County.

Little Six is named after Little Six, a leader during the Dakota War of 1862.  Its sister casino is Mystic Lake Casino Hotel.

History
Little Six Casino is owned and operated by the Shakopee Mdewakanton Sioux Community (SMSC), a federally recognized, sovereign Indian tribe.

The SMSC opened Little Six Bingo in 1982, which became Little Six Casino in 1990 following the passage of the federal Indian Gaming Regulatory Act of 1988 and the signing of a gaming compact between the SMSC and State of Minnesota. Little Six Casino opened in its new facility in 2007.

Awards
The SMSC Gaming Enterprise, which includes Little Six Casino and Mystic Lake Casino Hotel, received a “Best Places to Work” award from the Minneapolis-Saint Paul Business Journal in 2012 and 2013 and a “Top 100 Workplaces” award from the Minneapolis Star Tribune in 2013.

See also
 Shakopee Mdewakanton Sioux Community
 List of casinos in Minnesota

External links
 Little Six Casino
 Mystic Lake Casino Hotel
 Shakopee Mdewakanton Sioux Community
 Minnesota Indian Gaming Association
 National Indian Gaming Association

References

Native American casinos
Casinos in Minnesota
Buildings and structures in Scott County, Minnesota
Tourist attractions in Scott County, Minnesota
1982 establishments in Minnesota
Casinos completed in 1982
Native American history of Minnesota
Shakopee Mdewakanton Sioux Community